Kocaeli Bayan Futbol Kulübü, shortly Kocaeli Bayan FK, is a Turkish sole women's football sports club, based in İzmit city of Kocaeli. It was founded by Hasan Alemdaroğlu in 2016. Currently, they play in the Turkish Women's Second Football League. The club colors are green and black.

The team finished the 2018–19 Women's Second League as runners-up, and was promoted to the Turkish Women's First Football League.

Stadium
Kocaeli Bayan FK play their home matches at Mehmet Ali Kağıtçı Stadium in İzmit, Kocaeli.

History
After their formation, Kocaeli Bayan FK started to play in the 2017–18 season of the Turkish Women's Third Football League. They finished the league as champion after play-off matches, and were promoted to the Turkish Women's Second Football League. The team became runners-up in the 2018-19 season, and were so promoted to the Turkish Women's First Football League.

Statistics

(1) Season discontinued due to COVID-19 pandemic in Turkey
(2) Season in progress

Current squad

Head coach:  Hasan Alemdaroğlu

Honours
Turkish Women's Second Football League
 Runners-up (1): 2018–19

Turkish Women's Third Football League
 Winners (1): 2016–17

Kit history

Squads

References

 
Women's football clubs in Turkey
Football clubs in İzmit
Association football clubs established in 2016
2016 establishments in Turkey